Sweden was represented by One More Time with the song "Den vilda" in the Eurovision Song Contest 1996.

At the contest, held in Oslo, Norway, One More Time performed last of 23, following Slovakia. At the close of the voting it had received 100 points, placing 3rd behind winner Ireland and runner-up Norway.

Before Eurovision

Melodifestivalen 1996 
Melodifestivalen 1996 was the selection for the 36th song to represent Sweden at the Eurovision Song Contest. It was the 35th time that this system of picking a song had been used. 1,323 songs were submitted to SVT for the competition. The final was held in the Victoriahallen in Stockholm on 24 February 1996, presented by Pontus Gårdinger and Siw Malmkvist and was broadcast on SVT1 and Sveriges Radio's P3 and P4 networks. The show was watched by 3,775,000 people. 10 songs competed in total; after these 10 songs were whittled down to 5, 11 regional juries gave points to decide the winner. The winner was "Den vilda", performed by One More Time. The song was written by group members Peter and Nanne Grönvall.

At Eurovision 
In 1996, for the only time in Eurovision history, an audio-only qualifying round of the 29 songs entered (excluding hosts Norway who were exempt) was held in March in order for the seven lowest-scoring songs to be eliminated before the final. Sweden received 227 points, winning the qualifying round and thus qualifying for the final.

On the night of the final, One More Time performed last of 23, following Slovakia. At the close of the voting it had received 100 points, placing 3rd behind winner Ireland and runner-up Norway.

Voting

Qualifying round

Final

References

External links
TV broadcastings at SVT's open archive

1996
Countries in the Eurovision Song Contest 1996
1996
Eurovision
Eurovision